"Mobscene" (stylized as "mOBSCENE") is a song by American rock band Marilyn Manson. It was released in April 2003 as the lead single from their fifth studio album, The Golden Age of Grotesque (2003). The song was nominated for a Grammy Award for Best Metal Performance, but lost out to Metallica's "St. Anger". As of 2020, the song sold around 50,000 copies in the United Kingdom, where it has also been streamed almost 4 million times. In the US, the song reached number 18 on the Billboard Mainstream Rock Tracks and number 26 on the Billboard Alternative Songs chart.

Composition
Manson has said that "Mobscene" was "pulled from the weirdest parts of my imagination." Prior to writing the song, Manson had seen several Busby Berkeley films with all-female chorus lines. He then met with his band and told them that he wanted to create a song that evoked Berkeley's films, the writings of Oscar Wilde, and an elephant stampede.

Critical reception
In PopMatters, Lance Teegarden deemed "Mobscene" the best track on the band's greatest hits album Lest We Forget: The Best Of (2004), writing "Here Manson finds the little bit of irreverence he is looking for." Teegarden praised Sköld's production. BuzzFeed's Richard James opined that the song "proves nu metal is the greatest gift to music ever".

Track listings
International CD single
"Mobscene"
"Tainted Love" (Re-Tainted Interpretation)
"Mobscene" (Rammstein's Sauerkraut Remix)
"Paranoiac"

US CD single
"Mobscene"
"Paranoiac"

Charts

References

External links

 Semiotic Analysis of mOBSCENE (in Czech)

2003 singles
2003 songs
Marilyn Manson (band) songs
Interscope Records singles
Nothing Records singles
Nu metal songs
Songs written by Marilyn Manson
Songs written by Tim Sköld